Elena Igorevna Lyadova (born 25 December 1980) is a Russian actress. In 2002, she graduated from Mikhail Shchepkin Higher Theatre School in Moscow, Russia. Her film credits include Elena (2011), The Geographer Drank His Globe Away (2013), Leviathan (2014) and Orlean (2015).

Biography
Elena Lyadova was born in on 25 December 1980 in Morshansk, Tambov Oblast. When Elena turned six, the family moved to Odintsovo, Moscow Oblast.

She graduated from the Higher Theatre School named after MS Shchepkin in 2002 and was accepted into the troupe of the Moscow Theatre for Young Audiences.

Career
Lyadova's career in cinema began in 2005, with the Golden George winning film Dreaming of Space by Alexei Uchitel.

In 2005, she had roles in Ekaterina Shagalova's melodrama Pavlov's Dog and in Andrei Proshkin's comedy Soldier's Decameron.

Elena acted in the 2009, television series The Brothers Karamazov by Yuri Moroz, based on the novel of the same name by Fyodor Dostoyevsky. In the film, Elena played the scandalous and vicious Grushenka.

In 2012, she was awarded the Best Actress Golden Eagle and Nika for her role as the daughter of the main character in Andrey Zvyagintsev's Elena. Two years later, she again received the Best Actress Golden Eagle and Nika for her role as the wife of the protagonist in Alexander Veledinsky's movie The Geographer Drank His Globe Away.

Creative collaboration of Elena Lyadova with Vadim Perelman continued in 2015: she starred in the dramatic miniseries Treason. The series tells about the fate of people whose spouses are unfaithful. The picture won the award of the Association of Producers of Cinema and Television in the nomination "Best miniseries".

In October 2013, on the TV channel Russia 1 premiered a detective historical miniseries by Vadim Perelman Ashes, in which Elena performed one of the main roles.

In 2015, the actress received the Silver George for the role of eccentric and promiscuous hairdresser Lidka in the black comedy film by Andrei Proshkin Orlean.

She played the supporting role of a young editor in the 2018 biographical drama film Dovlatov which was screened at the 68th Berlin International Film Festival.

Personal life
During the filming of Soldier's Decameron (2005) she became romantically involved with actor Aleksandr Yatsenko, with whom she lived for seven years.

In 2015, she married actor Vladimir Vdovichenkov.

Filmography

Film

Television

References

External links

1980 births
Living people
People from Morshansk
Russian film actresses
Russian television actresses
Russian stage actresses
21st-century Russian actresses
Recipients of the Nika Award